Saint Benedict's College may refer to:

Saint Benedict's College (Trinidad and Tobago), in La Romaine
St Benedict's College, Bedfordview, Johannesburg, South Africa
St Benedict's College, Randalstown, Antrim, Northern Ireland
St. Benedict's College, Colombo, Sri Lanka
St Benedict's College (Liverpool), England
College of Saint Benedict and Saint John's University, St. Joseph, Minnesota, U.S.
St. Benedict's Convent and College Historic District
Benedictine College, formerly St. Benedict's College, Atchison, Kansas, U.S.
Presentation College, San Fernando, formerly St. Benedict's College, San Fernando, Trinidad and Tobago

See also
Benedict College, Columbia, South Carolina, U.S.